Khaliawas Titarpur is a village in Rewari district, Haryana, India.

Demographics
As of 2011 India census, Khaliawas Titarpur had a population of 1203 in 279 households. Males (654) constitute 53.5%  of the population and females (549) 46.49%. Khaliawas Titarpur has an average literacy rate of 67.46%, lower than the national average of 74%: male literacy is 60.94%, and female literacy is 39.05% of total literates . In Khaliawas Titarpur, Rewari 13.47% of the population is under 6 years of age .

Rajiv Gandhi Herbal Park and Nature Camp, Sahabi Barrage 
Rajiv Gandhi Herbal Park and Nature Camp, Sahabi Barrage was set up in 2011 by Government of Haryana at Sahabi barrage to promote eco-tourism. It includes a herbal conservation park, ayurveda center, wetlands and children park set up by the Forests Department, Haryana. It also has log huts accommodation, tree houses, nature trails and dining facilities run by the Haryana Tourism. Haryana Forest Development Corporation (HFDC) plans to build an adventure tourism centre, with a one km long ropeway, on 45 acres of land at Khaliyawas barrage.

Adjacent villages
Nikhri on NH-48
Masani
Rasgan
Dungarwas
Jaunawas (Jonawas)

References 

Villages in Rewari district